Hans Henn (19 December 1926 – 14 August 1993) was a West German bobsledder who competed in the mid-1950s. He won a bronze medal in the four-man event at the 1955 FIBT World Championships in St. Moritz. Henn also finished eighth in the four-man event at the 1956 Winter Olympics in Cortina d'Ampezzo. He was born in Grimmelshausen and died in Garmisch-Partenkirchen.

References
Bobsleigh four-man world championship medalists since 1930
Wallenchinsky, David. (1984). "Bobsled: Four-man". In The Complete Book of the Olympics: 1896-1980. New York: Penguin Books. p. 561.

External links
  

1926 births
1993 deaths
German male bobsledders
Bobsledders at the 1956 Winter Olympics
Olympic bobsledders of the United Team of Germany